The Nièvre is a river in the department of Somme, Hauts-de-France region of northern France. Its source is in the commune of Naours and it flows into the Somme near Flixecourt.

References

Rivers of Somme (department)
Rivers of France
Rivers of Hauts-de-France